James Carson Needham (September 17, 1864 – July 11, 1942) was an American lawyer and politician who served as a seven-term U.S. Representative from California from 1899 to 1913.

Biography 
Born in a covered wagon at Carson City, Nevada, James Needham arrived as a baby with his parents Charles and Olive at Mayfield, Santa Clara, California, October 1, 1864.
He attended the Santa Clara County public schools.
He was graduated from the California Wesleyan College at San Jose in 1886 and from the law department of the University of Michigan at Ann Arbor in 1889.
He served as clerk in The Adjutant General's Office of the War Department in Washington, D.C., from September 1, 1887, until September 1, 1888, when he resigned to complete his law course.
He was admitted to the bar in 1889 and commenced practice in Modesto, California.
He was an unsuccessful candidate for election to the State senate in 1890.

Congress 
Needham was elected as a Republican to the Fifty-sixth and to the six succeeding Congresses (March 4, 1899 – March 3, 1913).
He was an unsuccessful candidate in 1912 for reelection to the Sixty-third Congress.
He resumed the practice of law in San Diego, California from 1913 to 1916, when he returned to Modesto, California, and continued his profession.
He was appointed judge of the superior court of California January 1, 1919.

Needham was elected to the same office in 1920 to fill an unexpired term.
He was reelected in 1922 and again in 1926, and served until January 1, 1935.

Death
He died in Modesto, California on July 11, 1942.
He was interred in the Masonic Cemetery.

References

1864 births
1942 deaths
Politicians from Carson City, Nevada
University of Michigan Law School alumni
Republican Party members of the United States House of Representatives from California